Jefferson F. Wescott was a member of the Wisconsin State Assembly.

Biography
Wescott was born on March 26, 1826, in Wethersfield, New York. He later taught school in New Glarus, Wisconsin, where his father was a local politician, as well as working as a farmer and merchant. He was a member of the Assembly during the 1869 session. In addition, he was Magistrate and Clerk of New Glarus and a justice of the peace. He was a Republican. On his 30th birthday, Wescott married Sarah E. Rogers. They would have eight children. His brothers, Walter and Ezra, were also legislators. Wescott died on February 16, 1879.

References

People from Wyoming County, New York
People from New Glarus, Wisconsin
Republican Party members of the Wisconsin State Assembly
American magistrates
City and town clerks
Schoolteachers from Wisconsin
Farmers from Wisconsin
19th-century American merchants
1826 births
1879 deaths
Educators from New York (state)
19th-century American politicians
19th-century American judges
19th-century American educators